29 DWD is a village in Rawatsar tehsil in Hanumangarh district in the Indian state of Rajasthan.

Demographics
As of 2011 India census, 29 DWD had a population of 969 in 173 households. Males constitute 53.8% of the population and females 46.1%. 29 DWD has an average literacy rate of 34.7%, lower than the national average of 74%, male literacy is 38.27%, and female literacy is 61.71%. In 29 DWD, 12% of the population is under 6 years of age.

References

Villages in Hanumangarh district